Fulvivirga is a genus from the family of Fulvivirgaceae.

References

Further reading 
 
 
 

Cytophagia
Bacteria genera